The 1883–84 season was the first season Stoke took part in a major competitive competition, the FA Cup.

Season review
Since Stoke were founded in 1863 their seasons consisted of friendly matches and the Staffordshire Senior Cup. There was the FA Cup which had been competed for by amateur clubs until the Football Association's resolution that a 'Challenge Cup' be established and open to all clubs belonging to the association which had a tremendous bearing on the game. Stoke first entered the FA Cup in 1883–84 but they were defeated 2–1 by Manchester in the first qualifying round. Edward Johnson scoring Stoke's first competitive goal.

FA Cup

Squad statistics

Before competitive football - 1868 to 1882
Prior to Stoke entering the FA Cup they competed in friendlies and in the Staffordshire Senior Cup.

The club contends that it was formed in 1863 as Stoke Ramblers F.C. when Railway students from the Charterhouse School in Surrey moved to Stoke-upon-Trent to work as apprentices for the North Staffordshire Railway Works. Amongst them was Henry Almond who was a keen sportsman and it is believed that he introduced football to the local workers although there is no record that matches took place. However, in 1868 it was reported in The Field newspaper that Stoke Ramblers had been formed with Almond as its captain and the club was to play under association football rules. It remains unclear as to whether Stoke played any matches from 1863 to 1868.

Legend

1868–69
Stoke's first recorded match was a fifteen-a-side game against E.W May's XV on 17 October 1868. Both sides were made up of local railway employees with Stoke Ramblers being captained by Henry Almond who played a major role in creating the club. The match finished 1–1 with both goals being scored by Almond and May. Stoke's second match was a goalless draw with D. Gordon's XI and then another draw followed against Congleton. Stoke recorded their first victory against Newcastle under-Lyme by the score of 2–0. The local papers stated that the matches were attended by a 'fashionable assembling of spectators'. Their final match of the first season saw them play Leek under Rugby football rules with Stoke winning by a goal and one try to Leek's two tries.

1869–70
No Matches recorded

1870–71
Stoke Ramblers suffered their first defeat at the hands of Whitchurch in December 1870 going down 1–0. The match is said to have been played under association football rules but with an oval ball. Stoke had beaten Derby School a fortnight earlier.

1871–72
The local press began to cover matches more fully by the 1871–72 season, while some sides were still fielding anything from eleven to fifteen players, there was far less variation in the overall rules.  There was a strong local bias in Stoke's fixture list during the first half of the 1871–72 campaign as they achieved victories over Sandbach, Burton-on-Trent, Congleton and Rugeley.  Towards the end of the season the team's performance fell away as Burton got their revenge and Stoke lost 3–0 to Derby School when they fielded two players less than Derby.

1872–73
In 1871 Thomas Slaney played his first match for Stoke and he would go on to become club captain and the club's first manager. Stoke played some interesting matches during the 1872–73 with Congleton, essentially a rugby team played Stoke with four men short so the Ramblers lent Congleton four reserves, despite butting up a brave fight Stoke won 2–0. The match against Nottingham Forest was played on a frosted surface and so the Forest players added nails to their boots to get a better grip. They caused a number of injuries to the Stoke players and Forest won 3–1. Stoke also played Notts County, Derby Town, Ashbourne, Shropshire Victoria, Burton-on-Trent, Tutbury, Whitchurch and Great Lever but the results of these matches went unrecorded.

1873–74
The only match recorded this season was against Birmingham but the result is unknown.

1874–75
Stoke played Wednesbury Old Athletic, Strollers and Stafford Road but the results went unrecorded.

1875–76
No Matches recorded

1876–77
No Matches recorded

1877–78
For the 1877–78 season the Staffordshire Football Association was formed and immediately set up the Staffordshire Senior Cup for interested teams and Stoke now attracting about 300 spectators decided to enter the competition. Stoke played their first senior match against village side Mow Cop and won by an incredible scoreline of 26–0, a club record. Stoke went on to lift the cup beating Talke Rangers 1–0 in the final. Stoke had now moved to the Victoria Ground and had dropped 'Ramblers' from their name.

 Staffordshire Senior Cup

 Friendlies

1878–79
Stoke retained the Staffordshire Senior Cup by beating Cobridge 2–1. Edward Johnson came to the club at this time and he would go on to become the club's first international player.

 Staffordshire Senior Cup

 Friendlies

1879–80
No matches in the Staffordshire Senior Cup and Stoke's results in 1879–80 were mixed.

 Staffordshire Senior Cup
No Matches recorded

 Friendlies

1880–81
Stoke suffered their first cup exit in 1880–81 losing 2–0 away at West Bromwich Albion.

 Staffordshire Senior Cup

 Friendlies

1881–82
Stoke beat Boothen All Saints 7–1 in the first round of the Senior Cup but no more matches were recorded.

 Staffordshire Senior Cup

No other matches recorded

 Friendlies

1882–83
Stoke reached the final of the Staffs Senior Cup by scoring 42 goals with Edward Johnson scoring 18. It was all in vain however as Stoke lost in the final to West Bromwich Albion.

 Staffordshire Senior Cup

 Friendlies

References

Stoke City F.C. seasons
Sto